"No Tengo Dinero" (English: "I Have No Money") is a song written and recorded by Mexican singer Juan Gabriel for his debut 1971 album El Alma Joven. The track was the album's first single also released in 1971 and is Gabriel's first career single.

Kumbia Kings version

In 2003, Mexican-American group A.B. Quintanilla y Los Kumbia Kings covered "No Tengo Dinero" which was released as the first single from their album titled 4. Featuring Juan Gabriel and El Gran Silencio, the song was given a Lo Nuestro award for Regional Mexican Song of the Year.

Chart performance

Juanes version
In 2021, Colombian singer Juanes covered the song. It peaked the Mexican Airplay Chart.

Chart performance

References 

1971 songs
1971 debut singles
2003 singles
Juan Gabriel songs
Kumbia Kings songs
Songs written by Juan Gabriel
Song recordings produced by A. B. Quintanilla
Song recordings produced by Cruz Martínez
RCA Records singles
EMI Records singles
EMI Latin singles